Wynberg Secondary School is a school in the Western Cape.

References

Schools in Cape Town
Wynberg, Cape Town